Hitech Pulse-Eight (formerly known as Hitech Grand Prix and Hitech Racing) is a British motor racing team. It was founded in 2002 by Dennis Rushen and David Hayle. The team started racing in the British Formula 3 Championship in 2003. The team also competed in the South American Formula Three Series, namely the Formula 3 Sudamericana. Currently the team competes in the FIA Formula 2 Championship, FIA Formula 3 Championship, GB3 Championship and the Formula Regional Middle East Championship.

History

Formula Three 
In its first season, Hitech scored five pole positions and six podium finishes, with drivers Danny Watts and Eric Salignon. Andrew Thompson also contributed some points finishes.  Watts finished the British F3 Championship in 5th place in a season that included a memorable win at Castle Combe. In the Korea Super Prix, guest driver Richard Antinucci achieved Hitech's first international race win.

In the second season, 2004, Thompson was retained and joined by drivers Marko Asmer, James Walker, and Lucas Di Grassi. Di Grassi had two wins and was classified in eighth place overall. Another of that year's highlights was a podium finish on Di Grassi's début at the Macau Grand Prix. Asmer managed to finish the championship closing the top 10.

In 2005, Hitech retained Asmer and brought in Tim Bridgman from Formula BMW. Asmer was the best of the duo, scoring no less than five second places, but missing out on an actual win, even so managing to snatch the fourth place in the championship.

For 2006, Hitech brought back James Walker, alongside James Jakes and Salvador Durán, with Jakes finishing 8th, Walker 9th and Durán 10th in a poor season that only heralded one podium finish (achieved by Walker).

In 2007 Hitech retained the services of Marko Asmer who joined Austrian Walter Grubmuller for an assault on the British F3 Championship.  Hitech and Asmer took the title, scoring 11 poles, 11 wins (from 22 races) and 9 fastest laps. Marko Asmer secured the title long before the final round and in the end by a margin of 85 points from Maro Engel.

In 2008, Walter Grubmuller was joined by the youngest driver in the sport, Max Chilton.

For 2012, Brazilian Felipe Guimarães took 4 wins and two poles to end fourth with Hitech Racing Brazil in the Formula Three Sudamericana series.

In 2013, Hitech's Brazilian ace Felipe Guimarães took both the Formula 3 Brazil Open and the Formula Three Sudamericana series titles, winning 13 races and obtaining 7 poles and 12 fastest laps in the process.

In 2014, Brazilian Felipe Guimarães defended his Formula 3 Brazil Open title with Hitech Racing Brazil in January 2014 at the 2014 Formula 3 Brazil Open with his teammate Victor Franzoni finishing second.

In 2015, the team changed its name to Hitech GP, and made guest appearances in the two final rounds of the European Formula 3 Championship with Alex Sims.

In 2016, Hitech joined forces with ART Grand Prix, to make a full season in the FIA F3 European Championship. George Russell and rookies Ben Barnicoat and Nikita Mazepin will race for the team. 2015's guest driver Sims again appeared in the 2016 season's final round at Hockenheim.

The following season, only Mazepin remained with the team, he was joined by 2016 Prema driver Ralf Aron, Jake Hughes and Honda Junior Tadasuke Makino.

For 2018 the team signed Enaam Ahmed, Ben Hingeley, Álex Palou

In 2019 the team was represented by Jüri Vips in the new FIA Formula 3 Championship. He was joined by Leonardo Pulcini, who raced in the GP3 Series, and 2016 French F4 champion Ye Yifei. The team saw four wins coming from Vips and Pulcini that ultimately resulted in the outfit finishing second behind Prema Racing in the teams' standings.

In 2019, Hitech GP provided a full race operation package to W Series, including preparation, shipping and all trackside requirements. Hitech GP also supplied race engineers and pit crew for each of the cars. This partnership was discontinued for the 2021 season following the 2020 season's cancellation due to the COVID-19 pandemic and Hitech GP's subsequent expansion into other series.

FIA Motorsport Games 
For the inaugural 2019 FIA Motorsport Games Formula 4 Cup  all drivers utilized KCMG KC MG-01 cars, which were operated by Hitech GP. This was the first Formula 4 car to feature Halo safety device.

GP2 Series 

In 2004, Hitech partnered with Piquet Sports to enter the GP2 Series, running Nelson Piquet Jr. and Alexandre Negrao. However, prior to the Istanbul round, it was announced that this partnership had ended and that Piquet Sports would run the team for the remainder of the season. Despite this, team would continue carrying the Hitech name until the end of the season

FIA Formula 2 Championship 
In January 2020, Hitech announced it would expand into the championship for the 2020 season.

FIA Formula 1 Championship 
It was reported in February 2023 that Hitech registered an interest in joining the F1 championship, at a date to be determined.

Ownership 
Founded in 2002 by Dennis Rushen and David Hayle as HiTech Racing Ltd, in 2015 Hayle in partnership with Oliver Oakes formed the company and its assets into a new company, HiTech Grand Prix Ltd to compete in the FIA F3 European Championship. In 2016, Hitech joined forces with ART Grand Prix, to make a full season in the FIA F3 European Championship. Gaining Nikita Mazepin as a driver, they also gained Russian minerals company Uralkali as a sponsor, and partial ownership by Dmitry Mazepin. Over the next few years, Mazepin increased his holding through Cyprus-based investment company Bergton Management Ltd to 75%. In March 2022, following the Russian war against Ukraine, the shares held by Bergton Management Ltd were relinquished to Oakes, who took full control of the company. Oakes had formed a new company Hitech Global Holdings Ltd on 11 March 2022 to take control of the shares, formed just three days after Mazepin and his son were sanctioned by both the UK Government and the European Union, resulting in questions being asked in the UK Parliament over the effect of sanctions against Russia.

Current series results

FIA Formula 2 Championship

In detail 
(key) (Races in bold indicate pole position) (Races in italics indicate fastest lap)

* Season still in progress.

FIA Formula 3 Championship

In detail
(key) (Races in bold indicate pole position) (Races in italics indicate fastest lap)

* Season still in progress.

F3 Asian Championship / Formula Regional Asian Championship

Formula Regional Middle East Championship

BRDC British Formula 3 Championship / GB3 Championship

Formula 4 UAE Championship

F4 British Championship

Former series results

F3 Asian Winter Series

FIA European Formula 3 Championship

† As Sims was a guest driver, he was ineligible for points.

British Formula 3 International Series

Timeline

See also 
 Atech Grand Prix
 ART Grand Prix
 2019 W Series

Footnotes

References

External links 
 

British auto racing teams
2002 establishments in the United Kingdom
British Formula Three teams
FIA Formula 3 Championship teams
FIA Formula 2 Championship teams
FIA Formula 3 European Championship teams
Formula 3 Euro Series teams
Auto racing teams established in 2002
Formula Regional teams